B. maxima may refer to:

 Benedictia maxima, a freshwater snail
 Bombina maxima, an Asian toad
 Brefeldia maxima, a slime mold
 Briza maxima, a plant with edible seeds and leaves